Robert Banneka Anderson Sr. was a teacher, state legislator, and postmaster in Georgetown, South Carolina. He served in the legislature from 1890 to 1896. He represented Georgetown County.

He served at the South Carolina Constitutional Convention of 1895.

His son Robert Banneka Anderson Jr. graduated from Hampton Institute and was a mail carrier in Georgetown.

References

Members of the South Carolina General Assembly
Year of birth missing
Year of death missing